Vladimir Nikolaevich Vasilyev (born August 8, 1967) is a Russian science fiction writer and musician. His first book was published in 1991. A professional writer since 1996.

Bibliography

Series

 Shandalar (Шандалар)
 Cloudy Land (Облачный край), 1994
 One Year of Life (Год жизни), 1996
 Otran's Black Stone (Черный камень Отрана), 1996

Shandalar was a rich and beautiful land, but the high gods have become angry with it, and so came great rains, great wars, and great hunger. The world was dying, but there were a few brave (or foolish) heroes who decided to prevent the death of the world, even if each of them will have to die for it. Bloody battles awaited the warriors, but they were protected by the Signs, the guardians of the Balance, and they were led by the fearless Miron, the most famous hero of Shandalar.

 Blades (Клинки)
 Blades (Клинки), 1996
 A Thicket's Soul (Душа чащобы), 1996

There is a mystery hidden where the ancient mountains rise, where eternal cold and winter rule. The Vikings call it the Box of Munir-raven, the Pechenegs know it as the Magic Chest, but the fair-haired Slavic warriors say that the chest hides the great Books of Crafts greater than all others. Three druzhinas head to find the chest from three parts of the world: Normans, sons of the sea; nomads from steppes; and the Russian vityazs. They go through danger, darkness, and sorcery. They go through our world and other worlds. Only one of three, however, would get what they seek.

 Big Kiev (Большой Киев)
 The Big Kiev Technician a.k.a. Hunt for Wild Trucks (Техник Большого Киева/Охота на дикие грузовики), 1997
 The Big Kiev Witcher (Ведьмак Большого Киева), 1999–2009

A kind of technological fantasy The Big Kiev Technician. The world in which machines are functioning by themselves and have consciousness similar to that of animals. Various races, such as humans and elves; wild and domestic vehicles. 
The Big Kiev Witcher is a short-story cycle included 10 stories which set in the Big Kiev universe. Witcher Geralt's work is to destroy machines-monsters; Geralt combines care for the City and indifference to all other things with inner warm feelings and care for alive, not shown to everyone. The series is inspired by Polish fantasy writer Andrzej Sapkowski's series about Geralt (The Witcher saga).

 Death or Glory (Смерть или слава)
 Death or Glory (Смерть или слава), 1998
 Black Relay Race (Черная эстафета), 1999
 Mobility War (Война за мобильность)
 Giants' Legacy (Наследие исполинов), 2002
 No One but Us (Никто, кроме нас), 2005

Death or Glory describes the struggle of humanity to find its place among the stars, when a giant ship suddenly appears in the skies of a human Wild-West-like colony world, soon to be followed by the five alien races (reptillian Svaigh, avian Aczanny and Zoopht, insectoid Swarm, and crystalline Ayeshi) and their extragalactic enemies (Imperishables). The humans embark on a quest to find out if the ship is a blessing or a curse.
Black Relay Race departs from the science-fiction theme and becomes a horror novel, in which people disappear one-by-one while transporting a mysterious object across space.
The War for Mobility duology takes place centuries after Death or Glory. Humanity has just joined the great Alliance of superior races, when a human scout ship locates a portal into another galaxy. The discovery sparks an interstellar war, as two of the former Alliance slave races (skeleton-like Shat-Tsurs and shapeshifting Oaons) attempt to destroy their former masters. Now the aliens which only recently looked down on humans must now rely on them to win the war and be the first to find the cache of star portals left behind by an ancient race in another galaxy, for the one who possesses the portals can move entire fleets instantaneously from system to system with nothing to stop them.
As Vasilyev noted in an interview, "Death or Glory was written under the impression from David Brin's duology Startide Rising and The Uplift War". While a relative success in Russia (17,000 copied of Death or Glory issued by 2000), the novel was only POD published in English in 2004 by Capricorn Publishing.

 Wolf Nature (Волчья натура)
 Wolf Nature (Волчья натура), 1999
 Everyone With Beast Inside (Зверь в каждом из нас), 2000
In duology describes Earth-like world, inhabited by beings, having descended from dogs not apes.

 World of Watches (Мир Дозоров)
 Day Watch (Дневной дозор), 2000 with Sergey Lukyanenko
 Black Palmira's Face (Лик Черной Пальмиры), 2003
 Time of Inversions (Время инверсий), 2012 
Day Watch was written in cooperation with famous Russian writer Sergey Lukyanenko. Vladimir Vasilyev wrote the second story of the Day Watch book - A Stranger Among Others - and part of the third story Another Power. 
Black Palmira's Face describes the life of Kiev city Day Watch and secret mission of Ukrainian Dark Mage's team in Saint Petersburg.
Time of Inversions describes the life of Kiev city Day Watch.

 The Altitude (Высота)
 The Skies Masters (Хозяева поднебесья), 2001
 A Chorister Owl Trill  (Трель певчей совы), 1996

Single novels

 UFO: Enemy Unknown (UFO: Враг Неизвестен), 1997. Novelization of the game UFO: Enemy Unknown.

"Nobody believes, that we were only eight at first. Eight strong foolhardy chaps, trained at Special Centre in London, for whom it was all the same, whether to be at war with terrorists, mafia or extraterrestrials. And then - hell and war, flying saucers, combat robots, labs and hangars. And the ruthless conquerors from space, who never knew doubt, as throughout millennia they have subdued thousands of inhabited worlds. All moves have been calculated long ago, every reciprocal action by the enemy considered. Soon a new planet will enter the interstellar empire. However, it is well known that humans learn to fight devilishly easy."

 Going Into The Night (Идущие в Ночь), 1999 with Anna Kitayeva (Lee).

"Вeyond the Yuben River lie the Wild Lands, where no trodden paths exist and every traveller must choose his or her own way - in the hopes of staying alive. Few have returned from there, and their tales were full of horrors. However, no one has ever told tales of the Stone Forest because nobody has ever returned from it. Who will go into the eternal night of the Stone Forest of their own free will? Morgan and Turi, who have nothing to lose, as there is blood on their hands and death behind them. No one will spare those who had the misfortune of being born werewolves."

 Three Steps on Dankarten (Три шага на Данкартен), 2000
 Hot Start a.k.a. Hearts and Engines (Горячий старт/Сердца и Моторы), 2002
 Antarctica-online (Антарктида-online), 2004 with Alexander Gromov

"Antarctica is a harsh, cold continent on the edge of the world and of little interest to the nations of the world. But if an unknown cataclysm moves it to the tropics, there will be plenty of interested parties who wish to add the new lands to their spheres of influence. Especially if drunk Russian polar researchers jokingly challenge the entire world and declare an independent Antarctic republic."

 The "Capudania"'s Treasure (Сокровище "Капудании"), 2007
 The Shadows of Future (Тени грядущего), 2009 with Konstantin Utolin and Roman Arilin
 Hide-and-Seek on Centre Line (Прятки на осевой), 2010 - novel in cross-author cycle of S.T.A.L.K.E.R. game Universe.
 Children of a duplicator (Дети дупликатора), 2011 - novel in cross-author cycle of S.T.A.L.K.E.R. game Universe.

Short story collections

 The Warrior Sign (Знак воина), 1996
 A Boarding in Cyberspace (Абордаж в киберспейсе), 1997
 A Stars over Shandalar (Звезды над Шандаларом), 1999 - Shandalar stories under one cover.
 A Jolly Roger on Hydrofoil (Веселый Роджер на подводных крыльях), 2002
 Forgotten Road (Забытая дорога), 2003
 Unlucky Gentlemans (Джентльмены непрухи), 2006
 Foreigner Worlds (Чужие миры), 2006
 The Subway Genius (Гений подземки), 2007
 The Unknown Earth (Незнакомка Земля), 2008

Awards

Music

Vladimir Vasilyev is also a guitar player and is also known as a singer and composer. In his songs, Vasilyev uses fantastical and unrealistic motifs.
His most well-known song is "Battlecat's March" (Марш Бойцовых котов), which has an allusion to Arkady and Boris Strugatsky's novel The Kid from Hell ("Парень из Преисподней").

Albums
 The Ambush-92 (Засада-92)
 Live in Kharkiv (Концерт в Харькове)
 Overdue confession 2014 (with "Prospekt Mira" band)

References

External links
Official web-site
Vasilyev fans forum
Vasilyev's blog

1967 births
Living people
Russian science fiction writers
Russian fantasy writers
Ukrainian emigrants to Russia
Ukrainian science fiction writers
Ukrainian fantasy writers
Musicians from Mykolaiv
Russian bloggers
Writers from Mykolaiv